At the 1956 Winter Olympics in Cortina d'Ampezzo, eight Nordic skiing events were contested – six cross-country skiing events, one ski jumping event, and one Nordic combined event.

1956 Winter Olympics events
1956
Cross-country skiing competitions in Italy